Destiny Chukunyere M.Q.R. (born 29 August 2002) is a Maltese singer. She won the Junior Eurovision Song Contest 2015, where she represented Malta with the song "Not My Soul".

In 2017, she participated in the eleventh series of Britain's Got Talent and finished 6th in the second semi-final and thus was eliminated. She won the second season of the Maltese version of The X Factor and was chosen to represent Malta in the Eurovision Song Contest 2020 in Rotterdam with the song "All of My Love" however the contest was canceled due to the COVID-19 pandemic. Instead, Destiny represented Malta in the Eurovision Song Contest 2021, this time with the song "Je me casse", where she finished in 7th place with 255 points.

Early life
Chukunyere was born on 29 August 2002. She lives in Birkirkara and attended a secondary school in Ħamrun. Her father is Nigerian (Igbo) former footballer Ndubisi Chukunyere, while her mother is Maltese. She has two younger siblings; a sister named Melody and a brother named Isaiah.

Career 
Prior to her participation in the Junior Eurovision, Chukunyere participated in various singing competitions including Festival Kanzunetta Indipendenza 2014 in which she placed third with the song "Festa t'Ilwien"; and won the Asterisks Music Festival, and  SanRemo Junior in Italy.

2015–2017: Junior Eurovision Song Contest

On 11 July 2015, Chukunyere won the Maltese national final held at the Mediterranean Conference Centre in Valletta. She represented Malta at the Junior Eurovision Song Contest 2015, in Sofia, Bulgaria on 21 November.

Chukunyere won the live national final with the Aretha Franklin song "Think", enabling her to represent Malta; her Junior Eurovision entry called "Not My Soul" was composed by Elton Zarb and written by Muxu with her involvement. Chukunyere won the contest with 185 points breaking the previous record score set by María Isabel in 2004.

On 13 December 2015, Chukunyere and her team were awarded the Midalja għall-Qadi tar-Repubblika.

2017–2019: Britain's Got Talent

In early 2017, Chukunyere auditioned for series 11 of ITV's Britain's Got Talent singing "Think", by Aretha Franklin, where she was given four yeses. Her audition was aired on 20 May. She has received praise from established music critic Simon Cowell and international renowned tenor Joseph Calleja. After listening and watching her perform, Cowell told to the rest of the judges that they "have been waiting for someone to come out who ... could be a star, and Destiny may be the one." On 27 May, she was announced as one of the qualifiers to the live shows and performed in the second semi-final on 30 May. She placed 6th in the semi-final and thus was eliminated.

2019–2020: X Factor Malta
In 2019, Chukunyere appeared in the Eurovision Song Contest 2019 in Tel Aviv, Israel as a backing singer for the Maltese entrant's, Michela Pace, song "Chameleon". The song qualified for the final, finishing in 14th place with 107 points. 

In 2019, Chukunyere was revealed to be taking part in the second season of X Factor Malta. She was placed in the Girls category, mentored by Ira Losco, and advanced to the live shows. On 8 February 2020, she won the competition.

2020–2021: Eurovision Song Contest

Due to her X Factor Malta win, Chukunyere was to represent Malta in the Eurovision Song Contest 2020, taking place in Rotterdam, Netherlands. Her entry song, "All of My Love", was released on 9 March 2020. However, on 18 March, the event was cancelled due to the COVID-19 pandemic. On 16 May 2020, it was confirmed that Chukunyere would represent Malta at the 2021 contest with the song "Je me casse". Her 2021 entry was released on 15 March 2021 on the official YouTube channel of the Eurovision Song Contest. "Je me casse" was released on all major streaming services on 22 March 2021. She placed seventh in the final with 255 points.

2022–Present: The Voice Kids Malta
On July 15, 2022, it was announced that Chukunyere will be featured as a Coach on the first season of The Voice Kids Malta.

Musical style and influences 
Chukunyere has named Aretha Franklin, Beyoncé, and Lizzo as her biggest idols and inspirations.

Discography

Singles

Promotional singles

References

External links

2002 births
Living people
Maltese child singers
21st-century Maltese women singers
21st-century Maltese singers
Maltese people of Nigerian descent
Junior Eurovision Song Contest winners
Junior Eurovision Song Contest entrants for Malta
Eurovision Song Contest entrants of 2020
Eurovision Song Contest entrants for Malta
Recipients of Midalja għall-Qadi tar-Repubblika
People from Birkirkara
Britain's Got Talent contestants
Eurovision Song Contest entrants of 2021